Lincoln Park was a park opened in 1894 by the Union Street Railway Company of New Bedford, Massachusetts, located in North Dartmouth, Massachusetts on the border of Westport, Massachusetts on U.S. Highway 6.  Lincoln Park closed in 1987 and remained abandoned and vacant until the Comet roller coaster was torn down on July 11, 2012.

History

Beginnings

Lincoln Park used to be known as "Midway Park" or "Westport Park" until a new name was chosen in a lottery.

The Union Street Railway Company created Lincoln Park in 1894 as a way to connect Fall River to New Bedford. 46 acres of land in Dartmouth was purchased and the park began. The park originally had picnic tables, a playground, and several grill stoves for cookouts. This continued into the 1920s, which was when Lincoln Park became more of an amusement park.

In 1941, the facility was purchased by John Collins & Associates for $40,000 ($500,000 inflation adjusted). They invested $150,000 installing a fourteen lane bowling alley and updating an existing dance hall, and added a full complement of amusement park rides.

Decline

The park was successful until the mid-1980s, when larger theme parks started to become more popular. A fatal accident on the park's 1946 "Comet" wooden roller coaster in 1986 caused people to question the safety of the park.

Facing declining attendance, Jay Hoffman, the park's owner, invested $75,000 in updating the park. This plan included moving the park's 1921 carousel to Battleship Cove in Fall River, and dismantling a smaller "kiddy" version of the "Comet" roller coaster. In a May 1987 story from The Providence Journal, he is quoted as saying that the park had been fully inspected and was safe.

However, just four months later on September 29, the braking system on the roller coaster failed, causing one of the cars to jackknife. Although no one was injured, this was the final ride of the coaster.

The park closed December 3, 1987, owing $48,000 in taxes and $13,000 in unpaid police details. Almost all of the rides were dismantled and auctioned off. The park's Ferris wheel was moved to the New Bedford waterfront.

The jack-knifed car remained stuck on the roller coaster track well into the 1990s, until vandals tore it off.

The abandoned park suffered a string of fires after its closing, a total of six as of May 2012. For years the only remaining structures in the park were some badly damaged food buildings and the roller coaster. The coaster's high starting "lift hill" collapsed during a heavy January 2005 snowstorm (Jan 22-26), the roof of the platform collapsed in May 2008 and much of the rear (southern) curve collapsed, probably due to water damage, around mid-May 2009. Two of the remaining buildings near the roller coaster partially collapsed in early 2008, both buildings collapsed by early 2010. The remainder of the roller coaster that was left standing was demolished on July 11, 2012.

Rides
The most popular ride was the "Monster Ride," where diabolical creatures were plotting your demise from beyond the railways. It featured two paper mache monsters overlooking your entry from the second floor balcony. It has appeared in several newspaper articles.

Reuse
The  site has been converted in part to residential use 

In May 2012, developers began clearing shrubbery, rock, and abandoned buildings in the former amusement park.

In July 2012, the Comet roller coaster was demolished. Single family homes, apartment buildings and commercial space will be constructed in its place. The fir wood used for the coaster will be used to make Adirondack chairs that will be sold for charity.

See also
List of amusement parks in New England
List of defunct amusement parks
Amusement ride
Comet (Lincoln Park)

References

External links

A MySpace tribute site for Lincoln Park & the Comet.
Comet Roller Coaster at Lincoln Park in Oct 2006.
A tribute site to Lincoln Park and The Comet with hundreds of photos from past and present, history, information, videos, and more!
 http://mark-wiley.artistwebsites.com/featured/the-comet-mark-wiley.html

1894 establishments in Massachusetts
1987 disestablishments in Massachusetts
Amusement parks closed in 1987
Amusement parks in Massachusetts
Amusement parks opened in 1984
Buildings and structures in Bristol County, Massachusetts
Dartmouth, Massachusetts
Defunct amusement parks in the United States